A convict is an individual who has been found guilty of a crime.

Convict or Convicts or The Convict may also refer to:

Arts, entertainment, and media
Convicts (film), a 1991 film starring Robert Duvall
The Convict (1910 film), an American silent short comedy
The Convict (1951 film), a French drama film
Convicts (band), American hip-hop band
Convicts (Convicts album), 1991
Convicts (You Am I album), 2006
"The Convict", an episode of The Office (U.S. version)
The Convict, an episode of Matlock

Other uses
The Convict, the later stage name for professional wrestler Kevin Wacholz
Convict cichlid, a species of fish
Convicted felon, one who has been convicted of a felony crime in a court of law

See also
Konvict, an alias of Akon's
Konvict Muzik, a record label owned and founded by Melvin Brown and Akon